Neacoryphus bicrucis is a species in the family Lygaeidae ("seed bugs"), in the order Hemiptera ("true bugs, cicadas, hoppers, aphids and allies"). The species is known generally as the "whitecrossed seed bug" or "ragwort seed bug".
The distribution range of Neacoryphus bicrucis includes Central America, North America, Oceania, and South America.

References

Further reading
 Henry, Thomas J., and Richard C. Froeschner, eds. (1988). Catalog of the Heteroptera, or True Bugs, of Canada and the Continental United States, xix + 958.
 Nishida, Gordon M., ed. (2002). "Hawaiian Terrestrial Arthropod Checklist, 4th ed.". Bishop Museum Technical Reports no. 22, iv + 313.
 Ross H. Arnett. (2000). American Insects: A Handbook of the Insects of America North of Mexico. CRC Press.
 Thomas J. Henry, Richard C. Froeschner. (1988). Catalog of the Heteroptera, True Bugs of Canada and the Continental United States. Brill Academic Publishers.

External links
NCBI Taxonomy Browser, Neacoryphus bicrucis

Lygaeidae
Insects described in 1825